"Great Scott!" is an exclamation of surprise, amazement, or dismay.

Great Scott may also refer to:

 Great Scott (lunar sample), a 21-pound rock picked up on the moon by Commander David Scott of Apollo 15
 Great Scott! (TV series), an American sitcom that aired in 1992
 Great Scott Township, St. Louis County, Minnesota
 The Great Scott, ring name for Canadian professional wrestler, booker and promoter George Scott
 Great Scott Films Inc, co-founded by Christopher J. Scott
 Great Scott! The Best of Jay Scott's Movie Reviews, a collection of reviews by Canadian film critic Jay Scott
 Nickname of A Greek–English Lexicon, specifically the longest editions of the work (Robert Scott is one of the co-authors)
 Great Scott was a famous miniseries on BNN featuring Scott Harris

Music
"Great Scott Rag", a 1909 composition by James Scott
 Great Scott! (1958 Shirley Scott album)
 Great Scott!!, an album by Shirley Scott released in 1964
 Great Scott! (1991 Shirley Scott album)
Great Scott!, compilation album by Little Jimmy Scott
 Great Scott (opera), a 2015 opera by composer Jake Heggie and librettist Terrence McNally